The LG Twins are a South Korean professional baseball team based in Seoul, South Korea. They are a member of the KBO League. The Twins play their home games at Jamsil Baseball Stadium, which they share with their rivals, the Doosan Bears.

History 
The club was established in 1982 as MBC Chungyong, owned by the Munhwa Broadcasting Corporation. In the first part of the 1982 season, the team played at Dongdaemun Baseball Stadium; in the second part of the season, they moved to their current home, Jamsil Baseball Stadium.

The Chungyong were initially led by player-manager Baek In-chun, who had spent 19 seasons in Japan's Nippon Professional Baseball. Aged 38, Baek led the league in hitting in 1982, with a record-setting .412 batting average. As manager, Baek brought the Japanese "small ball" technique to his team, focusing on sacrifice bunts, stolen bases, and sacrifice flies. Although the team finished above .500 in 1982, Baek was dismissed by the team after the season.

In , the franchise was acquired by the LG Corporation, which renamed the team the LG Twins. The following year, the Twins won their first Korean Series title with Baek In-chun as their manager. In 1994, they won their second championship. The Korean Series MVP was Kim Yong-soo in both Series, and his jersey number 41 was later retired. However, after their last Korean Series appearance in 2002, the team has gone through the dark ages, not making the postseason for eleven years until 2013, when they earned the second seed in the regular season and qualified for the playoff series, where they were eliminated by the Doosan Bears. Between 2014 and 2022, the Twins made six postseason appearances, but failed to return to the Korean Series. As of 2022, their 28-year championship drought is the second longest in the league.

Season-by-season records

Team

Current lineup

Managers
Baek In-chun (1982)
Kim Dong-yeop (1983)
Eo Woo-hong (1984–1985)
Kim Dong-yeob (1986–1987)
Yu Baek-man (1988)
Bae Seong-seo (1989)
Baek In-chun (1989–1991)
Lee Kwang-hwan (1992–1994)
Cheon Bo-seong (1995–1999)
Lee Gwang-eun (2000–2001)
Kim Sung-keun (2002)
Lee Kwang-hwan (2003)
Lee Sun-cheol (2004–2006)
Kim Jae-bak (2007–2009)
 (2010–2011)
Kim Ki-tae (2012–2014)
Yang Sang-moon (2014–2017)
Ryu Joong-il (2018–2020)
Ryu Ji-hyun (2021–2022)
Youm Kyoung-youb (2022–present)

In popular culture
The team featured prominently in the tvN drama Reply 1994, where the team's 1994 head coach is a main character. In the drama, the team is referenced under a different name, "Seoul Twins", due to trademark issues with the LG Corporation.

References
General

Specific

External links 

 Official website 

 
KBO League teams
Baseball teams established in 1982
Sport in Seoul
LG Sports
1982 establishments in South Korea